Boluo fan or pineapple rice is a method of preparing rice for consumption that is used by the Dai people, a Tai cultural group residing in Yunnan province, southwest China.

Description of process
The rice (usually a mix of purple and white) is soaked overnight, then steamed for around an hour. A ripe pineapple is hollowed out by slicing the top off and removing the flesh or by cutting it lengthwise in two halves, and the flesh is cut into small cubes.

The steamed glutinous rice is then mixed with the removed pineapple flesh, raisins, rock sugar, dash of salt, coconut milk, and sliced almonds, filled back in the hollow pineapple steamed for another 20 minutes. Boluo fan is a sweet staple, perfect as a side dish for hot and spicy Yunnan food, and also goes well with Sichuan dishes.

Geographical extent
Similar techniques of preparation exist in other Tai-inhabited areas, i.e. Burma, Laos, Thailand, Vietnam.

See also
 Rice, History of domestication and cultivation

Yunnan cuisine
Foods containing coconut
Pineapple dishes
Rice dishes